Kampong Selayun is a village in Brunei-Muara District, Brunei. The population was 1,875 in 2016. It is one of the villages within Mukim Sengkurong. The village is under the responsibility of the village head of Kampong Sengkurong 'B'. It has the postcode BG1721.

References 

Selayun